Lydia Zeitlhofer (18 February 1931 – 10 September 2019) was a German gymnast. She competed in seven events at the 1952 Summer Olympics.

References

1931 births
2019 deaths
German female artistic gymnasts
Olympic gymnasts of Germany
Gymnasts at the 1952 Summer Olympics
Sportspeople from Nuremberg